Trocodima hemiceras is a moth in the family Erebidae. It was described by William Trowbridge Merrifield Forbes in 1931. It is found on Puerto Rico.

References

Phaegopterina
Moths of the Caribbean
Insects of Puerto Rico
Moths described in 1931
Taxa named by William Trowbridge Merrifield Forbes